Bourbriac (Gallo: Bólbriac) is a commune in the Côtes-d'Armor department of Brittany in northwestern France.

Population

Inhabitants of Bourbriac are called in French Briacins.

Breton language
In 2007, 9.7% of primary school children attended bilingual schools.  In 2008, 9.09% of primary school children attended bilingual schools.

See also
Communes of the Côtes-d'Armor department

References

External links

  

Communes of Côtes-d'Armor